Laubuka varuna is a cyprinid fish species in the family Cyprinidae. It is endemic to Sri Lanka.

Etymology
The specific name varuna is from Sinhala language meaning "western of the island" of Sri Lanka, confirming that the presence of this freshwater fish to western parts of the country.

Description
It can grow to  standard length.

References

Laubuka
Freshwater fish of Sri Lanka
Endemic fauna of Sri Lanka
Taxa named by Rohan Pethiyagoda
Taxa named by Maurice Kottelat
Taxa named by Anjana Silva
Taxa named by Kalana Maduwage
Taxa named by Madhava Meegaskumbura
Fish described in 2008